Nguyễn Côn (15 May 1916 – 9 January 2022) was a Vietnamese politician.

Biography
He served as Deputy Prime Minister of Vietnam between 1967 and 1976. In October 2021, he celebrated 85 years of membership in the Communist Party of Vietnam. He died on 9 January 2022, at the age of 105.

References

1916 births
2022 deaths
Place of birth missing
Vietnamese centenarians
Men centenarians
People from Nghệ An province

Members of the 3rd Secretariat of the Workers' Party of Vietnam
Members of the 3rd Central Committee of the Workers' Party of Vietnam
Members of the 4th Central Committee of the Communist Party of Vietnam
Members of the 5th Central Committee of the Communist Party of Vietnam